Carlos Fren (born 27 December 1954) is an Argentine former footballer and manager. He spent most of his playing career in Argentinos Juniors and Independiente. He has also managed these clubs.

Playing career
Fren began his playing career in 1973 with Argentinos Juniors. Between 1976 and 1978 he played alongside teenage sensation Diego Maradona in the Argentinos midfield. He made over 200 appearances for the Paternal club before joining Independiente in 1978.

Fren played 103 league games for independiente before leaving to join their fiercest rivals Racing Club in 1982. In 1980, he was included in the Argentina squad for the 1980 Mundialito.

After a short stint with Nueva Chicago in 1983 he joined Vélez Sársfield where he played 56 league games between 1984 and 1985.

Towards the end of his playing career he had stints with Atlanta and Tigre in the lower leagues of Argentine football and Everest of Ecuador.

Managerial career

Fren began coaching in the youth teams of Nueva Chicago and Vélez Sársfield. His first first team appointment was his former club Independiente in 1991. In 1994, he teamed up with Diego Maradona as joint manager of Deportivo Mandiyú. In 1995, the pair had another unsuccessful attempt at management with Racing Club.

In 1996, Fren notoriously spent a single game in charge of Argentinos Juniors before resigning.

From there, Fren went on to coach the reserve team of Talleres de Córdoba and then work as assistant coach to José Pastoriza at Independiente. In between 2004 and 2005, he worked with Luis Garisto at Instituto de Córdoba and in 2007, he had a spell in charge of 12 de Octubre of Paraguay.

References

External links
 BDFA profile
 Managerial statistics
 Managerial statistics with Maradona

Argentine footballers
Association football midfielders
Argentinos Juniors footballers
Club Atlético Independiente footballers
Racing Club de Avellaneda footballers
Nueva Chicago footballers
Club Atlético Vélez Sarsfield footballers
Club Atlético Atlanta footballers
Futbolistas del Club Deportivo Everest
Club Atlético Tigre footballers
Club Atlético Independiente managers
Textil Mandiyú managers
Racing Club de Avellaneda managers
Argentinos Juniors managers
Instituto managers
Argentine Primera División players
Argentine expatriate footballers
Expatriate footballers in Ecuador
1954 births
Living people
Footballers from Buenos Aires
Argentine football managers